S. Mike Kiegerl (born April 8, 1939) is a former Republican member of the Kansas House of Representatives. He served from 2005 to 2017.

Kiegerl is the founder and current CEO of PRM Incorporated. He has a BA in Business and Economics from the University of Illinois, and an MBA in International Management from American Graduate School.

Issue positions
Kiegerl's official website lists his legislative priorities:

We must address the separation of powers issue again
Continue to reform Workers Compensation
Increase benefits to injured workers and increase the cap on permanent total disability benefits without raising rates.
We must assure that our schools get more funding than provided by the very flawed bill passed this year.
Educating the population of Kansas on fiscal policy and economics.

Committee membership
Joint Committee on Children's Issues (Chair)
Federal and State Affairs (Vice-Chair)
Social Services Budget

Major Donors
The top 5 donors to Kiegerl's 2008 campaign:
1. Kiegerl, S M $2,386 	
2. Kiegerl, S Mike $1,368 	
3. Kansas Realtors Assoc $900
4. Kansas Credit Union $800
5. Koch Industries $800

References

External links
Official Website
Kansas Legislature - S. Mike Kiegerl
Project Vote Smart profile
Kansas Votes profile
Separation of powers
Pharmacy benefit management
Fiscal policy
Follow the Money campaign contributions:
2006, 2008

Republican Party members of the Kansas House of Representatives
Living people
1939 births
University of Illinois alumni
21st-century American politicians